The 2020–21 Dallas Stars season was the 54th season for National Hockey League franchise that was established on June 5, 1967, and the 28th season since the franchise relocated from Minnesota prior to the start of the 1993–94 NHL season. On December 20, 2020, the league temporarily realigned into four divisions with no conferences due to the COVID-19 pandemic and the ongoing closure of the Canada-United States border. As a result of this realignment, the Stars remained in the Central Division this season and played games against only the other teams in their realigned division during the regular season.

The Stars experienced a COVID-19 outbreak during training camp, with 17 team members testing positive.  The team's first four games were postponed. The Stars finally began the season on a high note eight days late on January 22, 2021, with a 7–0 rout of the Nashville Predators.  

On May 8, the Stars were eliminated from playoff contention after the Nashville Predators defeated the Carolina Hurricanes 3–1, becoming the first team since the 2014–15 Los Angeles Kings to miss the playoffs after making the Stanley Cup Finals the year prior.

Standings

Schedule and results

Regular season
The regular season schedule was published on December 23, 2020.

Player statistics

Skaters

Goaltenders

†Denotes player spent time with another team before joining the Stars. Stats reflect time with the Stars only.
‡Denotes player was traded mid-season. Stats reflect time with the Stars only.
Bold/italics denotes franchise record.

Draft picks

Below are the Dallas Stars' selections at the 2020 NHL Entry Draft, which was originally scheduled for June 26–27, 2020 at the Bell Center in Montreal, Quebec, but was postponed on March 25, 2020, due to the COVID-19 pandemic. It was instead held on October 6–7, 2020, virtually via video conference call from the NHL Network studio in Secaucus, New Jersey.

Notes

References

Dallas Stars seasons
Dallas Stars
Dallas Stars
Dallas Stars